Adilson Tibes Granemann (born 1 January 1982), known as Adilson, is a former Brazilian footballer who played as a center forward.

References

External links 
 

1982 births
Living people
Association football forwards
Sportspeople from Santa Catarina (state)
Brazilian footballers
União Esporte Clube players
C.S. Marítimo players